Santa Fe de Antioquia  is a closed airstrip that formerly served the town of Santa Fe de Antioquia in the Antioquia Department of Colombia.

Google Earth Historical Imagery shows that the  grass runway was built over with houses between 2006 and 2010.

See also

Transport in Colombia
List of airports in Colombia

References

External links
OpenStreetMap - Santa Fe de Antioquia

Defunct airports
Airports in Colombia